Athletics New Brunswick (in French Athlétisme Nouveau-Brunswick) is the provincial organizing body for track and field, cross country running, race walking, and road racing in New Brunswick. The organization is the official branch of Athletics Canada and was incorporated in 1991 to replace the former organization, The New Brunswick Track and Field Association. The organization offers programs to affiliated and non-affiliated participants annually, reaching some 3000 athletes, coaches, officials, and volunteers across the province.

History
Athletics New Brunswick was incorporated in 1991 as a branch of Athletics Canada to promote and govern the sport of athletics in the province and to replace the former organization, The New Brunswick Track and Field Association (the former member of Athletics Canada and the Canadian Track and Field Association). Since its incorporation, ANB has reached almost 800 members in 2012. The organization has been known over recent years for its involvement in masters athletics, notably since the 2012 NCCWMA Championships in Saint John, New Brunswick. This, along with the 2010 World Junior Championships in Athletics hosted in Moncton, New Brunswick, has greatly increased the general interest in the sport of athletics throughout the province. With more and more athletes each year, along with improved programs and quality national level coaching, the province has seen its teams to compete at nationals to become better and better each year, achieving better places and scores, as well as more medals.

Presidents

Notable athletes
Current and former notable athletes from the province include:
 William Best - 800m Canadian champion, competitor at the 1989 Jeux de la Francophonie at the age of 18, and a personal best of 1:46.52.
 Joël Bourgeois - 3000m steeplechase runner, gold medalist at the 1999 Pan American Games, silver medalist at the 2003 Pan American Games, and competitor in the 1996 Summer Olympics and 2000 Summer Olympics.
 Barry Britt - Silver medalist at the 2011 Canadian cross country championships, standout at the University of Idaho with personal bests of 4:07.33, 8:07.02, and 14:03.48 in the one mile, 3,000m, and 5,000m respectively.
 Ryan Cassidy - Multiple Canadian champion in the steeplechase event, competitor at the 2010 and 2012 IAAF World Junior Championships in Athletics. Became the first ever Canadian cross country champion from New Brunswick with his win in the junior race in 2011.
 Rejean Chiasson - Marathon runner, New Brunswick marathon record by over 10 minutes (2:17:47) and 2012 Canadian marathon champion.
 Diane (Matheson) Clement - Bronze medalist at the 1958 Commonwealth Games, former Athletics Canada president, and co-founder of the Vancouver Sun Run. In 2011 she was named to the Athletics Canada Hall of Fame.
 Giovanni Corazza - Javelin thrower, competed in the 1978 Commonwealth Games, qualified for the 1980 Summer Olympics but didn't compete due to the Canadian boycott.
 Shayne Dobson - T37 Paralympic athlete, Canadian T37 record holder in the 800m and 1500m and dual medalist at the 2011 Parapan American Games in the 800m (bronze) and 1500 (silver).
 Adam Gaudes - Competitor for Canada at the 2009 World Youth Championships in Athletics in the 400m, and the 2010 World Junior Championships in Athletics on the 4 × 400 m relay team.
 Caleb Jones - Javelin Thrower, competitor for Canada at the 2010 World Junior Championships in Athletics.
 Geneviève Lalonde - Multiple Canadian champion in distance races and the steeplechase event, competitor at the 2010 World Junior Championships in Athletics, 2011 Summer Universiade, and 2012 NACAC Under-23 Championships in Athletics. 2011 Canadian Interuniversity Sport (CIS) Cross Country Champion, gold medalist with a games record, and Canadian record, performance at the 2013 Canada Summer Games, and bronze medalist at the 2013 Jeux de la Francophonie. With her bronze medal performance in the steeplechase event at the 2013 Jeux de la Francophonie, Lalonde became the first ever female New Brunswick medalist in athletics.
 Lindsay Laltoo - Competitor for Canada at the 2002 IAAF World Cross Country Championships. First Canadian in the junior women's race
 Michael LeBlanc - Competitor for Canada at the 2012 IAAF World Indoor Championships.
 William Maynes - Fourth place in the 4 × 400 m relay at the 1924 Summer Olympics.
 Hal Merrill - Paralympic thrower, dual bronze medalist at the 1992 Summer Paralympics in the shot put and javelin, and bronze medalist at the 1996 Summer Paralympics in the shot put. Member of the New Brunswick Sports Hall of Fame.
 Andrew "Zan" "Jack" Miller - Competitor in the high jump event at the 1924 Summer Olympics.
 Sigurd Nielsen - 100 yard sprinter in the 1938 British Empire Games.
 Mike Sokolowski - Competitor in the 4 × 400 m relay event at the 1984 Summer Olympics.

Programs

Athletics New Brunswick offers various programs designed to increase participation and provide high-performance competition opportunities to the province's athletes. Programs include:
 Run Jump Throw Wheel
 12 Défis/Challenges
 Youth Cross Country Series
 Legion National Track and Field Championships
 Jeux de l'Acadie/The Acadian Games
 Jeux de la Francophonie Canadienne/Canadian Francophone Games
 Canada Summer Games
 Jeux de la Francophonie Internationale/World Francophone Games
 Athlete Development Support Program
 Maritime Track League

The Athlete Development Support Program (a merging of the previous Podium Program and High Performance Program) provides financial assistance to compete at the Association's highest performing athletes.

See also
 Sports in Canada
 Athletics Canada
 Other Provincial Organizations Governing Athletics

References

External links
 Official Website
 New Brunswick Track and Field Clubs
 New Brunswick Records in Track and Field

Sports governing bodies in New Brunswick
Companies based in Dieppe, New Brunswick
Sport in New Brunswick
Athletics (track and field) in Canada
Sports organizations established in 1991
1991 establishments in New Brunswick